Barbara Lynne Park (formerly Tidswell; April 21, 1947 – November 15, 2013) was an American author of children's books.

Life and career
Barbara Park was the daughter of a merchant and a secretary, Doris and Brooke Tidswell. She and her older brother grew up in Mount Holly, New Jersey. Park graduated from Rancocas Valley Regional High School in 1965. From 1965 to 1967, she attended Rider College, finishing her Bachelor of Science in 1969 at the University of Alabama.

She married Richard A. Park in 1969. She lived in Phoenix, Arizona for almost 30 years and had two sons, Steven and David. The couple had two grandsons.

She was the author of the popular Junie B. Jones children's books. The series was aimed at young readers and included around 30 different titles. The series has sold over 55 million copies in North America alone.  She also wrote many middle-grade novels, such as The Kid in the Red Jacket.

Park won seven Children's Choice Awards and four Parents' Choice Awards.

Death
Park died on November 15, 2013, at her home in Scottsdale, Arizona, at the age of 66, from ovarian cancer.

Works

References

External links
 Junie B. Jones at publisher Random House
  1981–2013

1947 births
2013 deaths
American children's writers
Deaths from cancer in Arizona
People from Mount Holly, New Jersey
Deaths from ovarian cancer
Rancocas Valley Regional High School alumni
Rider University alumni
University of Alabama alumni
Writers from Phoenix, Arizona
Writers from New Jersey